Dr. Naqvi is an economist, professor and researcher in fields of development economics, theories of value and theory of individual choice and social welfare. In the past he was a lecturer and economics theory researcher at AUBG, Justus Liebig University, Central Michigan University and Middle Tennessee State University. Amongst other research publications, Dr Naqvi is notable for his contribution in developing general equilibrium model for Lesotho. As of 2015 Dr Naqvi is lecturing at KIMEP University.

Research and publications 
Dr Naqvi began his academic career in 1984. His first publication was on an inter-temporal theory of investment and international trade. His most cited works include research publications on unemployment, development economics, interest rates and the pure theory of international trade.

Dr Naqvi worked together with Dr. Keenan and Pech on Dynamic Tariff and Quota Retaliation in Markov Perfect Equilibrium. Dr Naqvi has academic interests in healthcare delivery evaluation, social identity diversification and social class disparities.

Background 
In 1981 Nadeem Naqvi received Bachelors in Economics at Delhi School of Economics. In 1984 Naqvi received PhD in Southern Methodist University. Upon graduation Dr Naqvi continued an academic career.

From 1984 till 1987 he worked as an assistant professor at Central Michigan University. From 1987 till 1999 he worked as an assistant professor at the University of Georgia; he was dismissed for sexual misconduct. From 1999 till 2000 he consulted the World Bank in Johannesburg on economic development theories for several Sub-Saharan countries, including Lesotho and South African Republic.

After the World Bank, Dr Naqvi pursued an academic career as a full-time professor in United States and Bulgaria, Germany and Kazakhstan. As of 2015 during his tenure in Kazakhstan Dr Naqvi is carrying out research on post-crises structural transformations of the economies significantly dependent on exports of petroleum and natural gas.

In 2015 Dr. Naqvi received an award by KIMEP PIE, a student organization at KIMEP University, as the Best professor of the year.

References

External links 
 Publications (Google Scholar)  
 Publications (IDEAS) 
 Publications (EconPapers) 
 Kazakhstan Economy Roundtable of Experts

Indian development economists
World Bank Chief Economists
Delhi School of Economics alumni
Living people
Indian officials of the United Nations
Year of birth missing (living people)